The Metropolitan Region of Curitiba, also known as Greater Curitiba, brings together 29 municipalities in the state of Paraná in a relative process of conurbation. The term refers to the extension of the capital of Paraná, forming with its bordering (or close) municipalities a continuous urban area. The population in 2015, according to the Brazilian Institute for Geography and Statistics was of 3,502,790 inhabitants.

In urban planning circles, the greater Curitiba area has received attention for advancing sustainable urbanization. Its leaders integrated the Bus Rapid Transit (BRT) and city development, using high-capacity, high-quality dedicated busways to guide growth along well-defined lineal axes.

References

Curitiba
Metropolitan areas of Brazil